Bucarabones may refer to:

Places
Bucarabones, Las Marías, Puerto Rico, a barrio
Bucarabones, Maricao, Puerto Rico, a barrio